Charles Clive Webster (born 31 January 2004) is an English footballer who plays as a midfielder for  club Chelsea.

Early life
Born in Kingston upon Thames and raised in Broughton, Webster started his career at the Pezzaz Street Soccer academy, before joining Chelsea at under-10 level.

Club career
Following good performances for Chelsea's youth teams, Webster was linked with a move to German side Borussia Dortmund in 2020. However, he signed a new contract with The Blues when he turned 17 in 2021.

He was included in The Guardian's "Next Generation" 2020 list, as one of the best young players emerging from Premier League sides.

At the age of 17, he was playing regularly for Chelsea's under-23 squad, and is seen as one of Chelsea's best young players.

In January 2023, Webster signed a new contract with Chelsea, extending his deal until the summer of 2024.

International career
Webster has represented England at under-16 level.

On 7 October 2021, Webster made his debut for the England U18s as a substitute during a 2-1 defeat to Norway in Marbella.

On 16 November 2021, Webster made his debut for the England U19s in a 2–0 victory over Sweden in a 2022 UEFA European Under-19 Championship qualification match.

Career statistics

Club
.

References

2004 births
Living people
English footballers
England youth international footballers
Association football midfielders
Chelsea F.C. players